Tseng Jing-ling (born 14 September 1947) is a Taiwanese politician who served as a Republic of China Army general. He was the Minister of the Veterans Affairs Commission of the Executive Yuan from 2009 to 2013.

Early career
Tseng was born in Nahchang, Kiangsi, and was moved to Taoyuan, Taiwan after the Chinese Civil War. Prior to entering political work, Tseng was the President of the National Defense University. Tseng currently lived in Taoyuan District, Taoyuan City.

References

Taiwanese Ministers of the Veterans Affairs Council
Living people
Republic of China politicians from Jiangxi
1947 births
Politicians from Nanchang
Educators from Jiangxi
Taiwanese people from Jiangxi

National Defense University (Republic of China) alumni